The 2012–13 St. Bonaventure Bonnies men's basketball team represented St. Bonaventure University during the 2012–13 NCAA Division I men's basketball season. The Bonnies, led by sixth year head coach Mark Schmidt, played their home games at the Reilly Center and were members of the Atlantic 10 Conference. They finished the season 14–15, 7–9 in A-10 play to finish in a three-way tie for 11th place. A year after being tournament champions, they failed to qualify for the Atlantic 10 tournament.

Roster

Schedule

|-
!colspan=12| Exhibition

|-
!colspan=12| Regular season

References

St. Bonaventure Bonnies men's basketball seasons
St. Bonaventure
St. Bonaventure Bonnies men's basketball
St. Bonaventure Bonnies men's basketball